Big Country are a Scottish rock band formed in Dunfermline, Fife, in 1981.

The height of the band's popularity was in the early to mid 1980s, although it has retained a cult following for many years since. The band's music incorporated Scottish folk and martial music styles, and the band engineered their guitar-driven sound to evoke the sound of bagpipes, fiddles, and other traditional folk instruments.

The band's "classic" lineup between 1981 and 2000, consisted of Stuart Adamson (vocals, guitar) Bruce Watson (guitar) Tony Butler (bass guitar) and Mark Brzezicki (drums). Following Adamson's death in 2001, the band reformed in 2007, with the surviving members. Between 2010 and 2013, the band reformed with Mike Peters of The Alarm on lead vocals. Since then the band has continued with only two of the original members (Watson and Brzezicki) and Simon Hough on vocals.

Career

Formation

Big Country comprised Stuart Adamson (formerly of Skids, vocals/guitar/keyboards), Bruce Watson (guitar/mandolin/sitar/vocals), Tony Butler (bass guitar/vocals) and Mark Brzezicki (drums/percussion/vocals). Before the recruitment of Butler and Brzezicki an early incarnation of Big Country was a five-piece band, featuring Peter Wishart (later of Runrig and now a Scottish National Party MP) on keyboards, his brother Alan on bass, and Clive Parker, drummer from Spizz Energi/Athletico Spizz '80. 

Adamson auditioned Parker (1981) at The Members' rehearsal room in Ladbroke Grove, London and the next day was called on to play drums on demos for CBS Records at their Whitfield Street studios. The demos were produced by Adam Sieff and just featured Adamson, Parker and Watson. Adamson had asked bassist Dave Allen from Gang of Four to join the band but he declined. Adamson asked Parker to join the band, which led to eight months of rehearsal in Dunfermline in a disused furniture warehouse.

The culmination was a concert at the Glen Pavilion in Dunfermline and an interview with BBC Radio Scotland where the CBS Studio demos were utilised. The band then played live with Alice Cooper's Special Forces tour for two concerts in February 1982 at Brighton and Birmingham.

Butler and Brzezicki, working under the name 'Rhythm for Hire,' were brought in to play on "Harvest Home." They immediately hit it off with Adamson and Watson, who invited them to join the band.

Commercial success
Big Country's first single was "Harvest Home", recorded and released in 1982. It was a modest success, although it did not reach the UK Singles Chart. Their next single was 1983's "Fields Of Fire (400 Miles)", which reached the UK's Top Ten and was rapidly followed by the album The Crossing. The album was a hit in the United States (reaching the Top 20 in the Billboard 200), powered by "In a Big Country", their only US Top 40 hit single. The song features heavily engineered guitar sounds, strongly reminiscent of bagpipes; Adamson and fellow guitarist Watson achieved this through the use of the MXR Pitch Transposer 129 Guitar Effect. Also contributing to the band's unique sound was their use of the e-bow, a device which allows a guitar to sound more like strings or synthesizer. The Crossing sold over a million copies in the UK and obtained gold record status (sales of over 500,000) in the US. The band performed at the Grammy Awards and on Saturday Night Live.

Big Country released the non-LP extended play single "Wonderland" in 1984, while in the middle of a lengthy worldwide tour. The song, considered by some critics to be one of their finest, was a Top Ten hit (No. 8) in the UK Singles Chart but, despite heavy airplay and a positive critical response, was a comparative flop in the US, reaching only No. 86 on the Billboard Hot 100. It was the last single by the band to make the US charts.

Their second album Steeltown (1984) was a hit as soon as it was released, entering the UK Albums Chart at No. 1. The album featured three UK top 30 hit singles, and received considerable critical acclaim on both sides of the Atlantic, but like Wonderland (and, in fact, all subsequent releases) it was a commercial disappointment in the US, peaking at No. 70 on the Billboard album chart.

On Christmas 1984, the four members participated in the Band Aid charity record "Do They Know It's Christmas?".  They are among a small handful of acts to contribute a spoken message to the B-side of the single.

Throughout 1984 and 1985 the band toured the UK, Europe, and to a lesser extent the US both as headliners and in support of such bigger-name artists as Queen and Roger Daltrey. They also recorded prolifically, and provided the musical score to a Scottish independent film, Restless Natives (1985), which was released years later on the band's Restless Natives and Rarities (1998) collection.  Big Country had backed Roger Daltrey on his 1985 solo album Under the Raging Moon, and Tony Butler played bass and provided backing vocals on Pete Townshend's 1980 hit single "Let My Love Open the Door" and the Pretenders' 1982 hit single "Back On The Chain Gang".  Both Butler and Brzezicki performed on Townshend's 1985 solo album White City: A Novel. Brzezicki played drums for The Cult on their 1985 Love album and was featured in the video for the single, "She Sells Sanctuary".

1986's The Seer, the band's third album, was another big success in the UK, peaking at Number 2. It produced three further Top 30 singles, including the Irish number one hit "Look Away", which would also prove to be the band's biggest hit in the UK, peaking at No. 7. Kate Bush provided backing vocals on the album's title track, and the album received good reviews from the music press. In the US, The Seer sold a little bit better than Steeltown, reaching No. 59 on the Billboard chart.
 
In what some critics felt was an apparent attempt to regain their dwindling US following, Big Country used producer Peter Wolf for their next album, Peace in Our Time (1988), which was recorded in Los Angeles. It reached No. 9 in the UK Albums Chart, but sold poorly in the United States. 
The album launch took place in Moscow and was accompanied by a tour of the USSR, a political statement some felt seemed insincere. During the Peace in Our Time UK tour, the band were supported by Diesel Park West and Cry Before Dawn.

The 1990s
No Place Like Home, Big Country's fifth studio album, was released in 1991. It was a commercial flop, and as a result nearly broke up the band. Drummer Mark Brzezicki returned to the studio as a session drummer after leaving the band. The album found Big Country trying to reinvent themselves and shift away from their 1980s image.  It was not a commercial success and was not released in America, although two re-recorded tracks showed up on 1993's The Buffalo Skinners.

In 1991, the band was dropped by Mercury and its distributor Phonogram, the companies that had released all of their material since 1983. After that, Big Country became a minor act, popping up in the lower echelons of the charts in the UK and Europe with the release of every subsequent album. Only one of these, 1993's The Buffalo Skinners, received a major label release (via Chrysalis Records), and it seemed a return to form of sorts for the band, reaching the UK Top 25. The album obtained enthusiastic critical response, and although it produced two UK Top 30 singles in "Alone" and "Ships", its sales were meagre. In June 1995, Big Country released their seventh studio album, Why the Long Face.

1999 saw the release of Big Country's eighth and final studio album with Adamson at the helm, Driving to Damascus (titled in its slightly different, augmented US release John Wayne's Dream). Adamson said publicly that he was pleased with the album but disappointed that it did not fare better on the charts. Later that year, he disappeared for a while before resurfacing, stating that he had needed some time off.

Adamson moved to Nashville in the mid-1990s, where he met country music singer/songwriter Marcus Hummon, and together they released an alternative country studio album as The Raphaels in 2001.

Farewell tour and Adamson's death
Adamson returned for the band's 'Final Fling' farewell tour, culminating in a sold-out concert at Glasgow's Barrowland Ballroom on 31 May 2000. They played what turned out to be their last gig in Kuala Lumpur, Malaysia, in October that year.

In November 2001, Adamson disappeared again. Numerous appeals were put on the Big Country website asking for Adamson to call home and speak to anyone in the band, the management company, or his ex-wife. The website also requested that any fans who might have been 'harbouring' the singer to contact the management company and alert them to his whereabouts. Mark Brzezicki and Tony Butler had indicated they were concerned but the reason Big Country had lasted so long was they stayed out of one another's personal lives, and both later noted they were unaware of the extent of Adamson's problems. He was found dead in a room at the Best Western Plaza Hotel in Honolulu, Hawaii on 16 December 2001, having been believed to have committed suicide.

A memorial to Adamson was held at Carnegie Hall, Dunfermline in January 2002, followed by a tribute concert at Glasgow Barrowlands in May. It brought together the remaining members of both Big Country and Skids; Adamson's teenage children, Callum and Kirsten; as well as Steve Harley, Runrig, Simon Townshend, Midge Ure and Bill Nelson.

2007–present
In 2007, to celebrate 25 years of Big Country, founding members Bruce Watson, Tony Butler (now lead vocalist for the first time), and Mark Brzezicki reunited to embark on a tour of the UK with dates in Scotland and England and a gig in Cologne (Germany). They also released a new album, Twenty Five Live, on the Track Records label. After the anniversary activity, the band returned to their hiatus.

The surviving original members toured again in late December 2010 and January 2011 with Mike Peters of the Alarm and Jamie Watson, Bruce's son, added to the line-up. This line-up began more regular touring as well as writing new material for potential release, in part with the involvement of record producer Steve Lillywhite. The efforts resulted in the creation of Big Country's first single in 11 years, entitled "Another Country".

In a September 2012 press release, Bruce Watson announced that Butler had retired from the group at the end of their last tour. He was replaced by former Simple Minds bassist Derek Forbes, who was Adamson's original choice for bassist on the initial Big Country recordings, although Forbes was not asked due to shyness on Adamson's part. The group also parted ways with longtime manager Ian Grant at the same time as Butler's departure. With the involvement of Forbes, later in 2012 and into 2013, the group recorded a new album in the Welsh town of Wrexham. The new material featured lyrics composed by Peters over band-written music; Butler still held writing credits on most of the album, with Forbes having contributed on a number of tracks as well, although he played all the album's bass parts. Titled The Journey, the album was released through Cherry Red Records in April 2013, becoming the group's first studio record since 1999. Further performances followed throughout the year, including a month-long North American tour between July and August.

Mike Peters left the band in November 2013 at the end of their 19-date Land's End to John O'Groats UK Tour. The band attributed Peters' departure to his inability to commit fully to Big Country, much of his time being devoted to The Alarm and solo projects. Initially, the band intended to continue as a four-piece, sharing lead vocals and returning all the songs to their original keys; Peters had required the songs to be tuned lower to accommodate his deeper voice. However, when they resurfaced in December 2013, they were joined by English singer Simon Hough, who performed most of the lead vocals as well as harmonica and additional guitar. While the status of Hough's membership was not immediately clarified, in a March 2014 podcast, Bruce Watson confirmed that Hough was now the band's fifth member. He also indicated that the group was working on new material, which would involve Hough, for potential future release.

On 9 July 2015, the band announced that Derek Forbes would no longer be performing with Big Country, and that all forthcoming gigs would go on with a replacement, Scott Whitley. On 12 November 2021, the band announced that bassist Scott Whitley would be leaving the band to pursue other interests. His replacement is Gil Allan from Dunfermline.

Band members

Current members
Bruce Watson – guitar, mandolin, sitar, vocals (1981–2000, 2007, 2010–present)
Mark Brzezicki – drums (1982–1989, 1993–2000, 2007, 2010–present)
Jamie Watson – guitars (2010–present)
Simon Hough – vocals, guitar, harmonica (2013–present)
Gil Allan – bass (2021–present)

Former members
Stuart Adamson – vocals, guitar, keyboards (1981–2000; died 2001)
Pete Wishart – keyboards (1981–1982)
Alan Wishart – bass (1981–1982)
Clive Parker – drums (1981–1982)
Tony Butler – bass (1982–2000, 2007, 2010–2012), vocals (2007)
Pat Ahern – drums (1990–1991)
Mike Peters – vocals (2010–2013)
Derek Forbes – bass (2012–2015)
Scott Whitley - bass (2015–2021)

Timeline

Discography

Studio albums
The Crossing (1983)
Steeltown (1984)
The Seer (1986)
Peace in Our Time (1988)
No Place Like Home (1991)
The Buffalo Skinners (1993)
Why the Long Face (1995)
Driving to Damascus (John Wayne's Dream) (1999)
The Journey (2013)

Music videos 
 "Harvest Home" – September 1982
 "Fields of Fire" – February 1983
 "In a Big Country" – May 1983
 "Chance" – August 1983
 "Wonderland" – January 1984
 "East of Eden" – September 1984
 "Where the Rose Is Sown" – November 1984
 "Just a Shadow" - January 1985
 "Look Away" – April 1986
 "Hold the Heart" – November 1986
 "The Teacher" – June 1986
 "One Great Thing" – August 1986
 "King of Emotion" – August 1988
 "Broken Heart (Thirteen Valleys)"  – October 1988
 "Peace in Our Time" – January 1989
 "Save Me" – April 1990
 "Heart of the World" – July 1990
 "Republican Party Reptile" – August 1991
 "Beautiful People" – October 1991
 "Alone" – March 1993
 "Ships" – April 1993
 "I'm Not Ashamed" – May 1995
 "You Dreamer" – August 1995
 "Fragile Thing" – August 1999
 "See You" – October 1999
 "Somebody Else" – May 2000
 "Another Country" – August 2011
 "Hurt" – April 2013
 "In a Broken Promise Land" – April 2013

References

External links
 
 Big Country Live
 Trouser Press: Big Country entry
 Big Country fan website
 Stuart Adamson website

Scottish alternative rock groups
Scottish new wave musical groups
Scottish rock music groups
Scottish folk rock groups
Celtic rock groups
Musical groups established in 1981
Musical quartets
Giant Records (Warner) artists
Mercury Records artists
Vertigo Records artists
Chrysalis Records artists
Transatlantic Records artists
Articles which contain graphical timelines
Scottish post-punk music groups
Second British Invasion artists